The Hanged Man may refer to:
A man who has been hanged
 The Hanged Man (Tarot card), Major Arcana Tarot card, also known as "The Traitor"
 The Hanged Man (album), a 1997 album by Poisoned Electrick Head
 "The Hanged Man", song by Moonspell from their 1998 album, Sin/Pecado
 "The Hanged Man", song by Dark Moor from their 2007 album, Tarot
 The Hanged Man, 1994 short novel by Francesca Lia Block
 The Hanged Man, a 2017 album by Ted Leo

TV and cinema
The Hanged Man (1964 film), American television film starring Robert Culp
The Hanged Man (1974 film), American television film, starring Steve Forrest
The Hanged Man (TV series), British crime drama (1975)
"The Hanged Man" (Journeyman), 2007 episode of the American TV series Journeyman
"The Hanged Man" (Da Vinci's Demons), TV episode of the American series Da Vinci's Demons, released on 12 April 2013

See also

 
 
Hangman (disambiguation)
Hanging man (candlestick pattern), a type of pattern on a market pricing graph